RDS-4 (also known as Tatyana) was a Soviet nuclear bomb that was first tested at Semipalatinsk Test Site, on August 23, 1953. The device was approximately one-third the size of the RDS-3.

The Soviet Union's first mass-produced tactical nuclear weapon was based on the RDS-4 and remained in service until 1966. It used a composite core of  Pu-239 and  90% enriched U-235  and had a nominal yield of 30 kilotons. The bomb was delivered from a Tu-4 and Tu-16 aircraft. A tactical weapon based on the RDS-4 was also used on September 14, 1954 during Snowball military exercise near Totskoye (similar to Western Desert Rock exercises), when the bomb was dropped by the Tu-4 bomber (the reverse-engineered Boeing B-29). The purpose of this exercise was not to test the bomb itself, but the ability of using it while breaking through enemy defenses (presumably in West Germany). After the explosion Soviet jet fighters were sent to fly through the mushroom cloud while tanks and infantry were forced to move through ground zero.

See also
Nuclear weapons program of the Soviet Union
Soviet atomic bomb project
RDS-3
Mark 7 nuclear bomb

References

1953 in the Soviet Union
1953 in military history
Explosions in 1953
August 1953 events in Asia
Soviet nuclear weapons testing
Nuclear bombs of the Soviet Union